Veraiyur is a panchayat town in Tiruvanamalai district, Tamil Nadu India.

References

Cities and towns in Tiruvannamalai district